Castleconor  is a mountain in Laois, Ireland. Castleconor's summit is at an altitude of  making it the fourth-highest point in Laois, the ninth-highest point in the Slieve Bloom Mountains and the 907th-highest summit in Ireland.

See also
List of mountains in Ireland
Geography of Ireland

References

Mountains and hills of County Laois
Geography of County Laois
Townlands of County Laois